CKBY-FM (92.3 MHz) is a commercial radio station licensed to Smiths Falls, Ontario, and serving the Ottawa Valley and the Western suburbs of Ottawa. The station is owned by Rogers Sports & Media. It broadcasts a country radio format and is branded as Country 92.3.

CKBY-FM has an effective radiated power (ERP) of 9,300 watts (17,000 watts maximum), horizontal polarization only.  The transmitter is on Ontario Highway 15 near Line Road 7 in Beckwith, Ontario.

History
The station was launched in 1955 by Rideau Broadcasting as CJET, at 1070 AM, and played a country format. Prior to signing on, the station would have been known as CFRL = "Rideau Lakes" it was changed to CJET when the station signed on. It began broadcasting in a daytime-only capacity On October 22, 1955. In 1958, the station's frequency changed to 630 AM.

In 1969, CJET-FM was launched at 101.1 FM as a stereo simulcast of the AM signal.

In 1984, the AM and FM stations were sold to Harvey Glatt's CHEZ-FM Inc., which was subsequently acquired by Rogers Communications, the stations' current owner, in 1999. On March 21, 2000, the Canadian Radio-television and Telecommunications Commission (CRTC) approved Rogers' application to convert CJET from the AM band (630 kHz) to the FM band at 92.3 MHz.
 On October 14, 2001, CJET-FM began testing at 92.3 MHz and launched on October 27 as Country 92. CJET's 630 AM transmitter was later shut down. The station adopted an adult hits format as 92.3 Jack FM in 2004.

On December 3, 2020, CJET returned to country as Country 92.3, taking on the format and programming of CKBY-FM after its flip to all-news radio as a simulcast of CIWW. The two stations also swapped call letters.

References

External links
 Country 92.3
 CKBY-FM history - Canadian Communications Foundation
Smiths Falls Then & Now - CJET
 

Jet
Jet
Jet
Smiths Falls
Jet
Radio stations established in 1955
1955 establishments in Ontario